Josip Perić (born 5 June 1992) is a Bosnian-Herzegovinian professional handball player for Tatabánya KC and the Bosnian national handball team.

References

External links

Living people
1992 births
Croats of Bosnia and Herzegovina
Bosnia and Herzegovina male handball players
People from Ljubuški
Bosnia and Herzegovina expatriate sportspeople in Germany
Bosnia and Herzegovina expatriate sportspeople in Hungary
Bosnia and Herzegovina expatriate sportspeople in Qatar
Bosnia and Herzegovina expatriate sportspeople in Romania
Expatriate handball players
Frisch Auf Göppingen players
Handball-Bundesliga players